Bird Township, Arkansas may refer to:

 Bird Township, Conway County, Arkansas
 Bird Township, Jackson County, Arkansas

See also 
 List of townships in Arkansas

Arkansas township disambiguation pages